The Molla Nakip Mosque is a mosque in Pazarkapi district of Trabzon, Turkey.

History
It was built in the 10th or 11th century, during Byzantine times as a church, and received its present name and function after the Ottoman conquest of the city in 1461. The north entrance was built by the Ottomans. In 1975 a large restoration took place and the ceiling was covered with concrete. The building has three naves and their apses are made of ancient stone blocks.

References

Byzantine sacred architecture
Empire of Trebizond
Mosques in Trabzon
Mosques converted from churches in the Ottoman Empire